Murray Lachlan Young (born 14 March 1969) is a British poet, stand-up performer, broadcaster, playwright, screenwriter and children's author. He came to prominence during the Britpop era of the mid-1990s, when he became the only poet to sign a recording contract worth £1m.

Personal life 
Murray Lachlan Young was born the youngest of two boys in Washington DC, to a Scottish father and an English mother.

He was brought up in Sevenoaks, Kent, where he attended Wildernesse School, graduating from Salford University with a degree in media performance.

In 1998, he married singer Zoë Pollock and after moving to a smallholding near St Leonards-on-Sea, they had two children. They moved to St Levan, Cornwall later in 2004, but separated in 2009.

In 2014, he married singer-songwriter Elizabeth Cavendish and set up home in Dalston, London, before separating in 2016.

Young lives in London.

Performances 

Since Young's early shows supporting such acts as Julian Cope, the Pretenders and Dita von Teese on the music and cabaret circuit in London, live stand-up poetry has been a key part of his career.

Tom Hodgkinson, editor of The Idler magazine, writes "Murray is both an actor and a wit, a poet who can perform and a performer who can write poetry, rolled into one."

Live solo shows include:
UK solo headline tours (2014 & 2016)
Glastonbury Festival of Performing Arts (1996–present, except 2015) 
MTV Music Awards, US (1997)
T in the Park Festival (1998 & 2001)
Port Elliot Festival (2005–present)
Latitude Festival (2006, ’13 & ’15)
Goodlife Festival (2013, ’14 & ’15)
Brighton Festival (2014) 
The Wilderness Festival (2014)
6 Music Festival (2014–present)
Festival No 6 (2015–present)
Poet in residence at The Union Club, Soho, London (1997–present) 
Poet in residence at The Arts Club, Mayfair, London (2014–16)

Books

Vice & Verse (1997)
Casual Sex and Other Verse (1997)
How Freakin' Zeitgeist Are You? (2017)
The Nine Dead Williams (2014)
The Mystery of the Raddlesham Mumps (2018)

Stage, film, dance and audio recordings

Stage
A Captive Audience (1992)
The Fabulous Twister Brothers (1993)
Modern Cautionary Tales for Children (2005) 
The Incomers (2013)
Rehab (2016)

Film
Features:
Under Milk Wood (co-written, 2015)
God’s Work (in development)
The Mystery of the Raddlesham Mumps
Summerset (writing)

Shorts:
Desideratum (1992)
Little Sucker Thumb (adapted, 1993)
Plunkett and McClean (Gallows poem, 1997)
Annie McClue (2011)
The Story of Martin (animation, in production)
Lycra Dad (in production)

Dance
Enjoy Your Stay (2010)
Taste (2015)

Audio recordings
Live at Ronnie Scotts (1995)
The Lost Album (1995)
Simply Everyone’s Taking Cocaine (1997)
Vice & Verse (1997)
Casual Sex (1998)
Murray Lachlan Young - Live (2011)
The Alien Balladeer (2013)

Broadcasting 
Radio
Poet in residence, The Breakfast Show, LBC (1996) 
Poet in residence, BBC 6 Music (2011–present day) 
Poet in residence, Saturday Live, BBC Radio 4 (2006–14)
Regular contributor to Loose Ends, BBC Radio 4 (1995–present day)
Regular contributor to Kaleidescope, BBC Radio 4 (1995)
Regular contributor to The Arts Show, BBC Radio 2 (2014–present day)
Regular contributor to BBC Radio 5 Live, including special commissions for Test Match Special, Cheltenham Gold Cup and City v United (2012–15)
Scotland meet Murray Lachlan Young, BBC Radio 4 (2013)
Alien Balladeer, BBC Radio 4 series (2014)
The Symphony of Medinah, Narrator, BBC Radio 5 Live (2014)
Cern, BBC World Service (2015)

Television
Murray Lachlan Young, MTV USA, series (1996)
Vice Versa, BBC 2 television special (1997)
Regular contributor, The Wright Stuff, Channel (2014–present)
Contributor, Newsnight, BBC 2, (2014)

Hartnoll & Young
In 2021, Murray Lachlan Young teamed up with Orbital's Paul Hartnoll for a lockdown inspired album called The Virus Diaries under the name Hartnoll & Young. In June 2021, the pair released a single from the album called "Garden Centre (Push the Trolley)" as a follow-up to "I Need a Haircut".

References

External links
 Official website
 

Living people
British poets
British male poets
1969 births
People from Sevenoaks